Paula Šūmane (born 4 May 1989 in Riga) is a Latvian concert violinist and the prize winner of international violin competitions and the Latvian Great Music Award. She is a graduate of Conservatoire national supérieur de musique et de danse de Paris and Universität für Musik und darstellende Kunst Graz. As a soloist, Paula Šūmane has performed with various symphony and chamber orchestras, including Latvian National Symphony Orchestra, Lithuanian State Symphony Orchestra, Lisbon Metropolitan orchestra, Hofer Symphoniker, Baden-Baden Philharmonic orchestra, Sinfonietta Rīga, Liepāja Symphony Orchestra. Paula Šūmane is frequently invited to give violin masterclasses and attend music competitions as a jury member.

References

External links

1989 births
Living people
Musicians from Riga
Conservatoire de Paris alumni
Latvian classical violinists
21st-century classical violinists
Women classical violinists